Cowling is an unincorporated community in Wabash County, Illinois, United States.

References

Unincorporated communities in Wabash County, Illinois
Unincorporated communities in Illinois